Hoosier Row School is a historic building located southwest of Indianola, Iowa, United States. The property for the one-room schoolhouse was acquired by Sub District No. 4, White Oak Township from Alva P. Keeny and Mary J. Keeny on March 10, 1870. The present building was constructed in 1900, and now serves as a community center. It was listed on the National Register of Historic Places in 2011.

References

School buildings completed in 1900
Buildings and structures in Warren County, Iowa
One-room schoolhouses in Iowa
School buildings on the National Register of Historic Places in Iowa
National Register of Historic Places in Warren County, Iowa
1900 establishments in Iowa